Xie Yingzhou (1894–1972) was a Chinese-born jurist.

Career
Xie's courtesy name was Xianting. He was educated in Tsungfa, and completed secondary education elsewhere in Guangdong and Shanghai. Xie married Gao Yicha at the age of 20, then left for France, where he pursued legal studies at the University of Paris.

Xie returned to China in 1924, joined the Kuomintang, and was offered a position on the faculty of law at National Guangdong University by school president .

The next year, Xie was named to positions within the Guangdong branch of the Kuomintang, working alongside . In 1927, Xie began teaching at the Republic of China Military Academy, National Central University in Nanking and the Peking University Law School. On 6 November 1928, Xie started working at the Examination Yuan. That December, he transferred to the Ministry of Justice, where he remained until 1932. He was then named a member of the Guangdong Provincial Government, serving as provincial minister of education from 1933. He retired from the bench in 1937. He remained at the National Audit Office until September 1945.

Subsequently, Xie returned to the Ministry of Justice until he was elected to the presidium of the National Assembly in 1947. Shortly after Xie was seated, he was named secretary general of the Taiwan Provincial Government, serving between 18 September 1947 and 20 July 1948. On 13 July 1948, Xie became president of the Supreme Court.

Xie moved to Taiwan in October 1949, and taught law at National Taiwan University, National Chengchi University, and Soochow University. He remained president of the supreme court until 1966. After the death of Fu Bingchang, Xie succeeded him as vice president of the Judicial Yuan. Xie died in Taipei on 20 April 1972, and was replaced by Tai Yen-hui.

Xie's grandson Ming Hsieh founded Cogent Systems.

References

1894 births
Republic of China politicians from Guangdong
1972 deaths
University of Paris alumni
Academic staff of the Republic of China Military Academy
Academic staff of Nanjing University
Academic staff of Peking University
20th-century Chinese judges
Chief justices
20th-century Taiwanese lawyers
Chinese Civil War refugees
Kuomintang politicians in Taiwan
Academic staff of Soochow University (Taiwan)
Academic staff of the National Chengchi University
Academic staff of the National Taiwan University
Taiwanese people from Guangdong
Academic staff of Sun Yat-sen University
Law school deans
Politicians from Guangzhou
Educators from Guangdong
Chinese university and college faculty deans